German submarine U-404 was a Type VIIC U-boat built for Nazi Germany's Kriegsmarine for service during World War II.

She was laid down at the Danziger Werft in the city of the same name on 4 June 1940 as yard number 105, launched a year later on 4 June 1941 and was commissioned  on 6 August 1941, with Kapitänleutnant Otto von Bülow in command.

The boat commenced her career with the 6th U-boat Flotilla, a training organization on 6 August 1941, before moving on to operations on 1 October 1941. She also damaged two other ships. The submarine was a member of 13 wolfpacks and was visually identifiable by the particular paint scheme consisting of a prow of a Viking longboat painted in red paint on either side of the conning tower.

For his numerous successes, von Bülow received the Knight's Cross.

Design
German Type VIIC submarines were preceded by the shorter Type VIIB submarines. U-404 had a displacement of  when at the surface and  while submerged. She had two shafts and two  propellers.

U-404 was fitted with five  torpedo tubes (four fitted at the bow and one at the stern), fourteen torpedoes, one  SK C/35 naval gun, 220 rounds, and a  C/30 anti-aircraft gun. The boat had a complement of between forty-four and sixty.

Service history

First and second patrols
No ships were sunk during her first patrol which lasted from 17 January to 1 February 1942. U-404 sailed from the German port of Kiel; the only excitement she encountered was when a periscope was damaged in an air attack. The submarine sailed into Lorient in France, after 16 otherwise uneventful days.

On her second patrol, when she departed Lorient on 14 February 1942, U-404 had more success, sinking three ships off the eastern American coast. One of them, Lemuel Burrows, was close enough to land when she was sunk that the second engineer, who survived, reported that "the lights of a New Jersey beach resort doomed his vessel and that they would continue [the German U-boats] to cause daily torpedoings until a blackout is ordered along the coast." This situation was repeated many times due to American unpreparedness so soon after that country's entry into the war. 
Another was the unescorted  sailing from Baltimore, Maryland, bound for the UK via Halifax, Nova Scotia with a cargo of 4,000 tons of alcohol and 7,000 tons of aviation spirit. She was northwest of Cape Charles, Virginia when torpedoed by U-404 on 17 March. 16 crew and three DEMS gunners were lost and six crew wounded but survivors managed to launch two lifeboats. Two days later the US tanker Beta rescued the Master, 26 crew and five DEMS gunners and took them to Norfolk, Virginia. The Master of San Demetrio was awarded a Lloyd's War Medal.

U-404 returned to Brest, also in France, on 4 April 1942.

Third and fourth patrols
The achievements of her second patrol was repeated on her third, with the Operation Drumbeat submarine accounting for another four ships off the American coast in June 1942: The Yugoslavian Ljubica Matokovic on June 24, Manuda (United States) and Nordal (Panama) on the 25th, and Moldanger (Norway) on the 27th. This time she returned to St. Nazaire.

For her fourth sortie, she left St. Nazaire on 23 August 1942 and returned on 13 October, having spent 52 days at sea and sinking three more ships, including the W-Class Destroyer HMS Veteran in mid-Atlantic.

Fifth and sixth patrols
It was a different story on her fifth patrol; she spent 44 fruitless days looking for targets, having departed St. Nazaire on 21 December 1942, returning on 6 February 1943.

Her sixth foray was better, she sank three ships, totalling .

Seventh patrol and loss
U-404 left St. Nazaire with a new commander on 24 July 1943. Four days later, she was sent to the bottom with all hands, at position , due to the efforts and depth charges of three Liberator aircraft, two American and one British. They did not emerge from the action unscathed; all three planes lost an engine due to the accurate anti-aircraft fire from the U-boat.

Wolfpacks
U-404 took part in 13 wolfpacks, namely:
 Schlei (21 – 24 January 1942) 
 Hecht (8 – 11 May 1942) 
 Pfadfinder (23 – 27 May 1942) 
 Stier (29 August – 2 September 1942) 
 Vorwärts (2 – 26 September 1942) 
 Luchs (27 – 29 September 1942) 
 Letzte Ritter (29 September – 1 October 1942) 
 Falke (28 December 1942 – 19 January 1943) 
 Landsknecht (19 – 28 January 1943) 
 Without name (27 – 30 March 1943) 
 Adler (7 – 13 April 1943) 
 Meise (13 – 20 April 1943) 
 Specht (21 – 25 April 1943)

Summary of raiding history

References

Notes

Citations

Bibliography

External links

German Type VIIC submarines
World War II submarines of Germany
1940 ships
U-boats commissioned in 1941
U-boats sunk in 1943
U-boats sunk by British aircraft
U-boats sunk by US aircraft
Ships lost with all hands
World War II shipwrecks in the Atlantic Ocean
Ships built in Danzig
Maritime incidents in July 1943